Adinda Permata Suci Nababan (born April 27, 1992), known professionally as Dinda Permata, is an Indonesian singer and musician. She rose to fame in Malaysia as one of the contestants of the season two of Big Stage, a Malaysian reality television show produced by Astro.

Big Stage Season 2
Dinda Permata represents her native country of Indonesia in Malaysian reality show, Big Stage Season 2 which airs on Astro Ria. She was announced as a second contestant to be eliminated on the third week. However, Bruneian representative Aziz Harun withdraw from the show to pursue his studies abroad and she was safe to compete the following week.

Discography

Singles
 "Ga Segitunya Keleus" (2016)
 "Ku Tak Bisa" (2018)
 "Seseorang Dihatimu" (2018)
 "Ku Tak Bisa" (2019)
 "Syarat Bahagia" (2019)
 "Cewek Matic" (2019)

Filmography

References

External links
 

1992 births
Living people
21st-century Indonesian women singers
People from Medan